Robert J. May III is an American politician. He is a member of the South Carolina House of Representatives from the 88th District, serving since 2020. He is a member of the Republican party.

In 2021 he was elected as the Vice Chairman of the South Carolina Freedom Caucus.

References

Living people
Republican Party members of the South Carolina House of Representatives
21st-century American politicians
People from Newport News, Virginia
1986 births
Tel Aviv University alumni
University of South Carolina alumni